Mohini Hameed (1922 - 16 May 2009, Seattle, Washington) better known as Apa Shamim or Shamim Apa, was first Pakistani radio broadcaster, anchor and actress. On 14 August 1947, when Pakistan gained independence, Mohini became the first woman broadcaster of Pakistan.  In May 2009 when she died, Lahore studio of Radio Pakistan was renamed ‘Mohini Hameed Studio’. She was the mother of journalist Kanwal Naseer.

Early life 
Mohini (born Mohini Das) was born in 1922 in Batala of British India.

Career 
Mohini joined All-India Radio Lahore in 1939 at the age of 17. Soon Mohini became a major female Urdu-language voice. She voiced almost every major radio play, or special announcement during her time at All-India Radio Lahore. When Pakistan gained freedom from the British, Mohini opted for Pakistan as her home. Mohini Hameed worked at Radio Pakistan for 35 years.

Personal life and death 
In 1954, Mohini Das married and became Mohini Hameed. Mohini Hameed died on 16 May 2009 in Seattle, Washington.

Awards and recognition 
Mohini Hameed was awarded numerous national awards, including:
 In 1965, she received Tamgha-e-Imtiaz, Fourth-highest civilian award of Pakistan
 In 1998, she was again awarded ‘Tamgha-e-Imtiaz
 In 1999, she was given ‘Lifetime Achievement Award’ by the Pakistan Broadcasting Corporation

References 

1922 births
2009 deaths
Recipients of Tamgha-e-Imtiaz
Pakistani radio presenters
Pakistani women radio presenters
All India Radio women
Pakistani people of Indian descent
Pakistani expatriates in the United States
21st-century Pakistani women
20th-century Pakistani women